Outraged is the eleventh studio album by Japanese heavy metal band Outrage. It was released on 5 June 2013 on the Thunderball 667 label.

Track listing

CD

Personnel
Naoki Hashimoto – vocals
Yosuke Abe – guitars
Yoshihiro Yasui – bass
Shinya Tange – drums

Additional 
Lisa Reuter - Cello (track 10)
Elin Sydhagen - Viola (track 10)

Charts

References

2013 albums
Outrage (band) albums
Albums produced by Fredrik Nordström